Men at a Dangerous Age is a 1954 West German comedy film directed by Carl-Heinz Schroth and starring Hans Söhnker, Liselotte Pulver and Annie Rosar. It was shot at the Wandsbek Studios in Hamburg. The film's sets were designed by the art directors Mathias Matthies and Ellen Schmidt.

Cast
 Hans Söhnker as Franz Volker
 Liselotte Pulver as Anna, sein Mündel
 Annie Rosar as Mau (Fräulein Mauritius)
 Wilfried Seyferth as Adam Kassner (Dichter)
 Ilse Bally as Lil Dewohl (Turnierreiterin)
 Günther Jerschke as Butz (Butzinzky, Sekretär)

References

Bibliography 
 Bock, Hans-Michael & Bergfelder, Tim. The Concise Cinegraph: Encyclopaedia of German Cinema. Berghahn Books, 2009.

External links 
 

1954 films
1954 comedy films
German comedy films
West German films
1950s German-language films
Films directed by Carl-Heinz Schroth
German black-and-white films
1950s German films
Films shot at Wandsbek Studios